The 2000 Stuttgart Masters was a men's tennis tournament played on indoor hard courts. It was the 12th edition of the event known that year as the Tennis Masters Series–Stuttgart or Stuttgart Masters, and was part of the Tennis Masters Series events of the 2000 ATP Tour. It took place at the Hanns-Martin-Schleyer-Halle in Stuttgart, Germany, from 30 October to 6 November 2000. Wayne Ferreira won the singles title.

Finals

Singles

 Wayne Ferreira  defeated  Lleyton Hewitt, 7–6(8–6), 3–6, 6–7(5–7), 7–6(7–2), 6–2
It was Ferreira's first singles title of the year, and the 14th of his career.

Doubles

 Jiří Novák/  David Rikl defeated  Donald Johnson /  Piet Norval, 6–2, 6–2
It was Novák's fourth doubles title of the year, and the 13th of his career.
It was Rikl's fourth doubles title of the year, and the 19th of his career.

References
General

 
Stuttgart Masters